Year 1060 (MLX) was a leap year starting on Saturday (link will display the full calendar) of the Julian calendar.

Events 
 By place 

 Europe 
 August 4 – King Henry I (a member from the House of Capet) dies after a 29-year reign in Vitry-aux-Loges. He is succeeded by his 8-year-old son Philip I (the Amorous) as king of France. Philip is too young to rule, and his mother, Queen Anne of Kiev becomes regent. France is administered by Count Baldwin V (one of Philip's uncles) who acts as co-regent.
 Summer – Norman forces under Duke Robert Guiscard invade Apulia, and capture the cities of Taranto and Brindisi (under control of the Byzantine Empire). Guiscard prepares a Sicilian expedition against the Saracens and returns to Calabria (Southern Italy), where his brother Roger Bosso waits with siege engines.
 December 6 – Béla I (the Champion) is crowned king of Hungary after his nephew, Solomon is deprived of the crown. He is supported by Duke Bolesław II (the Generous) – who helps him (with Polish troops) to obtain the Hungarian throne.

 China 
 The compilation of the New Book of Tang is completed, under a team of scholars led by Ouyang Xiu.
 Cai Xiang, a Chinese calligrapher and official, publishes his essay Cha Lu ("The Record of Tea").

 By topic 

 Religion 
 Anselm enters the Benedictine Bec Abbey in Normandy, as a novice (approximate date).

Births 
 February 9 – Honorius II, pope of the Catholic Church (d. 1130)
 September 18 – Godfrey of Bouillon, French nobleman (d. 1100)
 September 22 – Vitalis of Savigny, Catholic saint and itinerant preacher (d. 1122)
 Ava (or Ava of Göttweig), German poet (approximate date)
 Aibert (or Aybert), French monk and hermit (d. 1140)
 Bernard degli Uberti, bishop of Parma (approximate date)
 Berthold I, German nobleman (approximate date)
 Berthold of Garsten, German priest and abbot (d. 1142)
 Brahmadeva, Indian mathematician (d. 1130)
 Clementia of Aquitaine, French noblewoman (d. 1142)
 Diarmait Ua Briain, king of Munster (d. 1118)
 Duncan II, king of Scotland (approximate date)
 Constantius Ducas, Byzantine emperor (d. 1081)
Diemoth (or Diemudis), German nun and writer (d. 1130)
Egbert II, German nobleman (approximate date)
Erard I, French nobleman (approximate date)
Eric I (the Good), king of Denmark (approximate date)
Felicia of Roucy, queen of Aragon and Navarre (d. 1123)
Fujiwara no Mototoshi, Japanese nobleman (d. 1142)
Gaucherius, French priest and hermit (d. 1140)
Godfrey I, count of Louvain (approximate date)
Goswin I, count of Heinsberg (approximate date)
Gregory of Catino, Italian monk and historian
Hamelin de Ballon, Norman nobleman (approximate date)
Herman II, margrave of Baden (approximate date)
Hui Zong, Chinese emperor (Western Xia) (d. 1086)
Mafalda of Pulla-Calabria, Norman noblewoman (d. 1108)
Odo of Tournai, bishop of Cambrai (d. 1113)
Odo I (the Red), duke of Burgundy (d. 1102)
Olegarius, archbishop of Tarragona (d. 1137)
Ranulf Flambard, bishop of Durham (d. 1128)
Richard of Salerno, Norman nobleman (approximate date)
Roger Borsa, Norman nobleman (or 1061)
Stephen Harding, English abbot (approximate date)
Tokushi, Japanese empress consort (d. 1114)
Walo II (or Galon II), French nobleman (d. 1098)

Deaths 
 January 18 – Duduc (or Dudoc), bishop of Wells
 May 12 – Matilda, duchess of Swabia (d. 1048)
 August 4 – Henry I, king of France (b. 1008)
 October 2 – Everelmus, French hermit
 October 8 – Hugh V, French nobleman
 October 15 – Luka Zhidiata, bishop of Novgorod
 November 14 – Geoffrey II, count of Anjou
 December 2 – Gebhard III, bishop of Regensburg
 December 22 – Cynesige, archbishop of York
 Abbas ibn Shith, king (malik) of the Ghurid Dynasty
 Abdallah ibn Al-Aftas, founder of the Aftasid Dynasty
 Ahimaaz ben Paltiel, Italian-Jewish liturgical poet (b. 1017)
 Andrew I (the Catholic), king of Hungary
 Chaghri Beg, co-ruler of the Seljuk Empire (b. 989)
 Dharma Pala, ruler of the Pala Dynasty (b. 1035)
 Dominic Loricatus, Italian monk and hermit (b. 995)
 Emund the Old, king of Sweden (approximate date)
 Esico of Ballenstedt, German nobleman (approximate date)
 Igor Yaroslavich, prince of Smolensk (b. 1036)
 Isaac I (Komnenos), Byzantine emperor
 Mei Yaochen, poet of the Song Dynasty (b. 1002)
 Otto I (or Odon), count of Savoy (approximate date)
 Pons II (or Pons William), count of Toulouse (b. 991)
 William I, Norman nobleman (approximate date)

References